Estonia competed at the XXI Olympic Winter Games in 2010 in Vancouver, British Columbia, Canada. These games are the eighth Winter Olympics games for Estonia.

Andrus Veerpalu as first Estonian six-time Winter Olympian, became the third cross-country skier in history to compete at six Winter Olympics, after Finns Marja-Liisa Kirvesniemi and Harri Kirvesniemi.

Medalists 
The following Estonian athletes won medals at the games:

Alpine skiing

Men

Women

Biathlon 

Men

Women

Cross-country skiing 

Men

Women

Figure skating 

Estonia  qualified 1 entrant in ladies singles, 1 in pair skating, and 1 in ice dancing, for a total of 5 athletes.

References

External links
 EOK – Vancouver 2010 

Nations at the 2010 Winter Olympics
2010
Winter Olympics